Trididemnum is a genus of tunicates belonging to the family Didemnidae.

The genus has cosmopolitan distribution.

Species
Species:

Trididemnum alexi 
Trididemnum alleni 
Trididemnum amiculum 
Trididemnum areolatum 
Trididemnum auriculatum 
Trididemnum banneri 
Trididemnum caelatum 
Trididemnum cerebriforme 
Trididemnum cereum 
Trididemnum clinides 
Trididemnum cristatum 
Trididemnum cyanophorum 
Trididemnum cyclops 
Trididemnum delesseriae 
Trididemnum discrepans 
Trididemnum dispersum 
Trididemnum erythraeum 
Trididemnum farrago 
Trididemnum fetia 
Trididemnum grandistellatum 
Trididemnum granosum 
Trididemnum hians 
Trididemnum inarmatum 
Trididemnum lanugineum 
Trididemnum lapidosum 
Trididemnum maragogi 
Trididemnum maratuae 
Trididemnum marmoratum 
Trididemnum mellitum 
Trididemnum meridionale 
Trididemnum microzoa 
Trididemnum miniatum 
Trididemnum natalense 
Trididemnum nebula 
Trididemnum nobile 
Trididemnum nubilum 
Trididemnum nubis 
Trididemnum opacum 
Trididemnum orbiculatum 
Trididemnum palmae 
Trididemnum paraclinides 
Trididemnum paracyclops 
Trididemnum pedunculatum 
Trididemnum pigmentatum 
Trididemnum planum 
Trididemnum polyorchis 
Trididemnum poma 
Trididemnum profundum 
Trididemnum propinquum 
Trididemnum pseudodiplosoma 
Trididemnum pusillum 
Trididemnum reticulatum 
Trididemnum rocasensis 
Trididemnum roseum 
Trididemnum sansibaricum 
Trididemnum savignii 
Trididemnum shawi 
Trididemnum sibogae 
Trididemnum sluiteri 
Trididemnum solidum 
Trididemnum spiculatum 
Trididemnum spongia 
Trididemnum spumosum 
Trididemnum strangulatum 
Trididemnum strigosum 
Trididemnum tectum 
Trididemnum tenerum 
Trididemnum thetidis 
Trididemnum titanium 
Trididemnum tomarahi 
Trididemnum translucidum 
Trididemnum vahaereere 
Trididemnum vermiforme 
Trididemnum vostoki

References

Tunicates